Rickey Medlocke (born February 17, 1950) is an American musician, best known as the frontman/guitarist for the Southern rock band Blackfoot and a member of Lynyrd Skynyrd. During his first stint with Lynyrd Skynyrd from 1971 to 1972, he played drums and sang lead on a few songs that would initially be released on 1978's "First and Last". Medlocke would rejoin Blackfoot in 1972 and later returned to Lynyrd Skynyrd in 1996 as a guitarist with whom he continues to tour and record today.

Being of Native American ancestry, specifically Lakota Sioux and Cherokee, Medlocke was inducted into the Native American Music Hall of Fame in 2008.

Early life
Rickey Medlocke was born Rickey Lynn Green on February 17, 1950, in Jacksonville, Florida. He was raised by his maternal grandparents. His grandfather, Paul "Shorty" Medlocke, was a bluegrass musician and taught his grandson to play a miniature banjo. Medlocke started performing onstage at age three, and his musical abilities increased over the years. He began teaching himself to play the guitar by age five and was playing drums in Shorty's band at age eight. Over the next several years Medlocke mastered the banjo, guitar, drums, mandolin, dobro and keyboards. He had a melodic singing voice and had taught himself to sing and play guitar at the same time. After graduating high school, Medlocke formed his first band, Fresh Garbage (inspired by the Spirit song), in which he was lead vocalist and drummer. That band soon changed its name to Hammer.

Career
Medlocke recorded shortly with the 1970s era Lynyrd Skynyrd band as a session musician, occasionally playing drums or singing lead on a few songs for them in 1971: "One More Time", "Preacher's Daughter", "Lend a Helpin' Hand", "Wino", "White Dove", "Comin' Home", "The Seasons", "Ain't Too Proud to Pray", and "You Run Around". On occasion, Medlocke played alongside the band's original drummer Bob Burns but came to desire the energy of a guitarist at the front of the stage. This resulted in his 1972 decision to reform Blackfoot. The band began touring and producing hit songs that included "Train, Train", which was written by his grandfather, and "Highway Song", written by Rickey Medlocke and Blackfoot drummer Jakson Spires, along with songs written by others. He disbanded the group in the early 1990s.

For a while in the 1990s, Medlocke thought about pursuing other careers until he received a phone call in 1996 from Gary Rossington inviting him to rejoin Lynyrd Skynyrd as a lead guitarist and primary songwriter. Rossington asked Medlocke if he remembered how to play "Free Bird", "Tuesday's Gone", and "Workin' For MCA", among others. Medlocke rejoined Skynyrd and has been a member since. Occasionally, Medlocke will step away from Skynyrd briefly to join musicians like Blackberry Smoke and Shooter Jennings onstage. He joined American Idol finalist Bo Bice on stage for a rendition of "Sweet Home Alabama" when the top three finalists from season four returned home.

Discography

With Blackfoot
No Reservations (1975)
Flyin' High (1976)
Strikes (1979)
Tomcattin (1980)
Marauder (1981)
Highway Song Live (1982)
Siogo (1983)
Vertical Smiles (1984)
Rick Medlocke And Blackfoot (1987)
Medicine Man (1990)
After the Reign (1994)
Live on the King Biscuit Flower Hour (1999)
Southern Native (2016)

With Lynyrd Skynyrd
Street Survivors (1977) (drums & chorus on One More Time recorded during 1971-1972)
Skynyrd's First and... Last (1978) (contains early recordings from 1971 and 1972)
Twenty (1997)
Lyve from Steel Town (1998)
Skynyrd's First - The Complete Muscle Shoals Album (1998) (contains early recordings from 1971 and 1972)
Edge of Forever  (1999)
Christmas Time Again (2000)
Vicious Cycle (2003)
Lynyrd Skynyrd Lyve: The Vicious Cycle Tour (2003)
God & Guns (2010)
Last of a Dyin' Breed (2012)

References

External links
 Biography at IMDB

Living people
1950 births
American rock guitarists
American male guitarists
Lead guitarists
Lynyrd Skynyrd members
Native American musicians
Musicians from Jacksonville, Florida
Guitarists from Florida
Blackfoot (band) members
20th-century American guitarists
American people of Lakota descent
American people of Cherokee descent
Blues rock musicians